SM UB-133 was a German Type UB III submarine or U-boat built for the German Imperial Navy during World War I. Completed after the end of hostilities, she was not commissioned into the German Imperial Navy but surrendered to Britain in accordance with the requirements of the Armistice with Germany. In 1922 she was broken up in Rochester.

Construction

She was built by Friedrich Krupp Germaniawerft of Kiel and following just under a year of construction, launched at Kiel on 27 September 1918. UB-133 carried 10 torpedoes and was armed with a  deck gun. UB-133 had a displacement of  while surfaced and  when submerged. Her engines enabled her to travel at  when surfaced and  when submerged.

References

Notes

Citations

Bibliography 

 

German Type UB III submarines
World War I submarines of Germany
1918 ships
Ships built in Kiel